Send Me Your Love is the second studio album by American singer Kashif. It was released by Arista Records on June 18, 1984 in the United States. His highest-charting album, Send Me Your Love reached number five on the US Top R&B/Hip-Hop Albums chart and spawned the hit singles "Baby Don't Break Your Baby's Heart", "Are You the Woman" and "Ooh Love". In 1985, "Edgartown Groove" brought Kashif and Al Jarreau a Grammy Award nomination for Best R&B Performance by a Duo or Group with Vocal. Send Me Your Love was digitally remastered for the first time by Finesse Records in 2008. In 2012, Funky Town Grooves also remastered and expanded the album including six additional bonus tracks.

Critical reception

AllMusic editor Ron Wynn called Send Me Your Love Kashif 's "best release from a performance standpoint; his vocals had more vigor and spirit than at any time before or since, and he toned down the production, varied the arrangements, and created a much more interesting and multi-faceted presentation than anticipated."

Track listing
All tracks produced by Kashif.

Personnel 
 Kashif – arrangements, lead vocals (1, 2, 3, 6, 7, 9), backing vocals (1, 6, 7, 9), keyboards (1, 2, 3, 5, 6, 7, 9), Yamaha DX7 (1, 4, 8), Oberheim OB-8 (1), Minimoog (1), drums (1-4, 6-9), percussion (1, 2, 3), bass (3, 6), all other instruments (3, 5, 7), Synclavier vocal arrangement (3), vocals (4), Oberheim OB-Xa (4), Synclavier (4, 7, 8, 9), Rhodes piano (6), synthesizers (6, 9), percussion (7), acoustic piano and piano solo (8), synth bass (8), vocal scats (8)
 Joseph Wooten – keyboards (5)
 Kenny G – keyboards (7), drums (7)
 Steve Horton – keyboards (9), arrangements (9)
 Ira Siegel – guitars (1, 2, 3, 5-9)
 Ronny Drayton – guitars (7)
 George Benson – guitar solo (7)
 Eddie Martinez – guitars (9)
 Wayne Braithwaite – bass (3, 8)
 Roy Wooten – drums (5, 6)
 Bashri Johnson – percussion (4, 8)
 V. Jeffrey Smith – saxophone solo (6), backing vocals (9)
 Meli'sa Morgan – backing vocals (1, 2, 3, 6, 9)
 Lillo Thomas – backing vocals (1, 2, 3, 6, 7, 9)
 Whitney Houston – featured vocal on tag (3)
 Siedah Garrett – vocals (4)
 La La – featured vocals (6)
 Al Jarreau – vocal scat (8)
 Michelle Cobbs – backing vocals (9)

Production 
 Kashif – producer 
 Darroll Gustamachio – recording, engineer, mixing 
 Steve Goldman – engineer 
 Michael O'Reilly – engineer 
 Phil Burnett – assistant engineer 
 Robin Lane – assistant engineer 
 Joe Marino-Dickinson – assistant engineer 
 Phil Wagner – assistant engineer 
 Donn Davenport – art direction 
 Mel Dixon – photography 
 Shanault Wadley – designs
 Lisa Daurio – stylist 
 Roland Copeland – hair stylist 
 Joseph DeConza – belts
 Quitefire/Chaloea – make-up
 Hush Productions and The New Music Group, Inc. – management

Charts

References

External links
 
 Send Me Your Love at Discogs

1984 albums
Kashif (musician) albums
Boogie albums